Straight from the Heart is the 11th album by the Gap Band, released in 1988 on Total Experience Records (their final release for the label). The album includes the single "Straight from the Heart", while the song "Sweeter Than Candy" was featured in the film Penitentiary 3.

Track listing

References
[ Allmusic]
Discogs

External links
 
 Straight From The Heart at Discogs
 Facebook Page
 Myspace Page
 Encyclopedia of Oklahoma History and Culture - Gap Band
 The Gap Band at WhoSampled
 Charlie Wilson in-depth interview by Pete Lewis, 'Blues & Soul' August 2011
 Charlie Wilson 2011 Interview at Soulinterviews.com

1988 albums
The Gap Band albums
Total Experience Records albums
Albums recorded at Total Experience Recording Studios